Zak Boagey (born 11 October 1994) is an English footballer who plays for Marske United.

Career
Boagey began his career with Middlesbrough before joining Hartlepool United in November 2012. He made his professional debut on 6 April 2013 in a 2–0 victory over Bury.

Boagey scored a hat-trick in a pre-season friendly in July 2013 against Billingham Town in half an hour for Pools in a 5–0 win.

In March 2014, Boagey joined Northern Premier League side Whitby Town until the end of the season.

References

External links

1994 births
Living people
Footballers from Hartlepool
English footballers
Association football forwards
Middlesbrough F.C. players
Hartlepool United F.C. players
Whitby Town F.C. players
West Auckland Town F.C. players
Marske United F.C. players
English Football League players
People educated at English Martyrs School and Sixth Form College